Samuel Ward Academy (formerly Samuel Ward Arts and Technology College) is a coeducational secondary school and sixth form located in Haverhill in the English county of Suffolk.

See also
List of schools in Suffolk

References

Academies in Suffolk
Secondary schools in Suffolk